The Grambling State University Historic District is a historic district located in Grambling State University campus, in Grambling, Louisiana.

The district area includes 16 contributing buildings and 5 non-contributing buildings. The district comprises school structures built between 1939 and 1960, with styles including Colonial Revival, Modern Movement and International Style.

The district was listed on the National Register of Historic Places on December 7, 2010.

Contributing properties

Long Hall, now Long-Jones Hall, built 1939.
Gym and Auditorium, now Eddie G. Robinson Museum, built 1939.
Lee Hall, built 1939.
Jewett Hall, built 1939.
Dunbar Hall, built 1956.
Gymnasium/Physical Education Building, built 1954.
Auditorium, built 1960.
Science Building, now Carver Hall, built 1958.
James Hall, built 1956.
Dining Hall, built 1960.
Brown Hall, built 1956.
President's House, now Student Judicial Affairs, built c.1950.
Female Faculty Housing, now University Police, built 1943.
Infirmary, now Foster Johnson Center, built 1943.
Natatorium, built 1958.
Athletic Department, built 1954.

See also
 National Register of Historic Places listings in Lincoln Parish, Louisiana
 Grambling State University

References

National Register of Historic Places in Louisiana
Lincoln Parish, Louisiana
Historic districts on the National Register of Historic Places in Louisiana
National Register of Historic Places in Lincoln Parish, Louisiana